Cinctipora is a genus of bryozoans in the family Cinctiporidae also known in fossil records.

See also
 List of prehistoric bryozoans

References

External links
 Cinctipora on www.eol.org

Stenolaemata genera
Cyclostomatida